Nezhdaninskoye was a rural locality (a selo) in Tomponsky District of the Sakha Republic, Russia, which existed until March 2, 2000.

Following the discovery and exploration of the Nezhdaninskoye gold deposit, the village was founded in order to begin mining operations.

Geography
The village is located in a narrow valley by river Tyry.

References

External links
 Unofficial website of Nezhdaninskoye

Former populated places in the Sakha Republic